Rawilson Batuil (born 29 April 1994) is a Malaysian professional footballer who plays as a defender for Malaysia Super League club Sabah and the Malaysia national team.

Club career
Rawilson, who hails from Kota Marudu, was roped into the senior Sabah side in 2014 from the Under-21 side. He was named as captain of the senior side in 2017 season when Jelius Ating took over as Sabah head coach.

International career
Rawilson (also known as "Jipun" as he is fondly known among his team-mates and friends) received his first call-up for the Malaysia national senior side in March 2018 following his impressive show in the opening quarter of the Malaysian League 2018. He made his international debut in the match against Cambodia on 10 September 2018.

Career statistics

Club

International

Honour
Sabah FA
Malaysia Premier League: 2019

References

External links
 

1994 births
Living people
Malaysian footballers
People from Sabah
Sabah F.C. (Malaysia) players
Association football defenders
Malaysia international footballers